The Federation of European Numismatic Associations (FENAP), an organisation of national numismatic trade associations from 26 European countries, of which the BNTA is the UK member.

European Num